Manamelkudi block is a revenue block in Pudukkottai district, Tamil Nadu, India. It has a total of 28 panchayat villages.

Villages of Manamelkudi Block 
1.	Ammapattinam 
2.	Bramanavayal 
3.	Edayathimangalam  
4.	Edayathoor 
5.	Kanadu 
6.	Karakathikottai  
7.	Karakottai 
8.	Kattumavadi 
9.	Keelamanjakudi  
10.	Kolendram 
11.	Kottaipattinam 
12.	Krishnajipattinam  
13.	Manaloor, Pudukkottai 
14.	Manamelkudi 
15.	Manjakudi  
16.	Minnamozhi 
17.	Mumpalai 
18.	Nelveli  
19.	Nerkuppai, Pudukkottai 
20.	Nilayur 
21.	Perumaruthur  
22.	Sathiyadi 
23.	Seyyanam 
24.	Thandalai, Pudukkottai  
25.	Thinayakudi 
26.	Vellur, Pudukkottai 
27.	Vettivayal  
28.	Vichoor, Ammapattinam 
29.      MelaPappanoor 
30.      Kelapappanoor

References 

 

Revenue blocks of Pudukkottai district